Timur ( Temür,  'Iron'; 9 April 133617–19 February 1405), later Timūr Gurkānī ( Temür Küregen), was a Turco-Mongol conqueror who founded the Timurid Empire in and around modern-day Afghanistan, Iran, and Central Asia, becoming the first ruler of the Timurid dynasty. An undefeated commander, he is widely regarded as one of the greatest military leaders and tacticians in history, as well as one of the most brutal. Timur is also considered a great patron of art and architecture as he interacted with intellectuals such as Ibn Khaldun, Hafez, and Hafiz-i Abru and his reign introduced the Timurid Renaissance.

Born into the Barlas confederation in Transoxiana (in modern-day Uzbekistan) on 9 April 1336, Timur gained control of the western Chagatai Khanate by 1370. From that base, he led military campaigns across Western, South, and Central Asia, the Caucasus, and Southern Russia, defeating in the process the Khans of the Golden Horde, the Mamluks of Egypt and Syria, the emerging Ottoman Empire, and the late Delhi Sultanate of India and emerging as the most powerful ruler in the Muslim world. From these conquests, he founded the Timurid Empire, which fragmented shortly after his death.

Timur was the last of the great nomadic conquerors of the Eurasian Steppe, and his empire set the stage for the rise of the more structured and lasting Islamic gunpowder empires in the 16th and 17th centuries. Timur was of both Turkic and Mongol descent, and, while probably not a direct descendant on either side, he shared a common ancestor with Genghis Khan on his father's side, though some authors have suggested his mother may have been a descendant of the Khan. He clearly sought to invoke the legacy of Genghis Khan's conquests during his lifetime. Timur envisioned the restoration of the Mongol Empire and according to Gérard Chaliand, saw himself as Genghis Khan's heir.

According to Beatrice Forbes Manz, "in his formal correspondence Temur continued throughout his life to portray himself as the restorer of Chinggisid rights. He justified his Iranian, Mamluk, and Ottoman campaigns as a re-imposition of legitimate Mongol control over lands taken by usurpers." To legitimize his conquests, Timur relied on Islamic symbols and language, referring to himself as the "Sword of Islam". He was a patron of educational and religious institutions. He converted nearly all the Borjigin leaders to Islam during his lifetime. Timur decisively defeated the Christian Knights Hospitaller at the Siege of Smyrna, styling himself a ghazi. By the end of his reign, Timur had gained complete control over all the remnants of the Chagatai Khanate, the Ilkhanate, and the Golden Horde, and even attempted to restore the Yuan dynasty in China.

Timur's armies were inclusively multi-ethnic and were feared throughout Asia, Africa, and Europe, sizable parts of which his campaigns laid waste. Scholars estimate that his military campaigns caused the deaths of 17 million people, amounting to about 5% of the world population at the time. Of all the areas he conquered, Khwarazm suffered the most from his expeditions, as it rose several times against him. Timur's campaigns have been characterized as genocidal.

Timur was the grandfather of the Timurid sultan, astronomer and mathematician Ulugh Beg, who ruled Central Asia from 1411 to 1449, and the great-great-great-grandfather of Babur (1483–1530), founder of the Mughal Empire, which then ruled almost all of the Indian subcontinent.

Ancestry

Through his father, Timur claimed to be a descendant of Tumanay Khan, a male-line ancestor he shared with Genghis Khan. Tumanay's great-great-grandson Qarachar Noyan was a minister for the emperor who later assisted the latter's son Chagatai in the governorship of Transoxiana.
Though there are not many mentions of Qarachar in 13th and 14th century records, later Timurid sources greatly emphasized his role in the early history of the Mongol Empire. These histories also state that Genghis Khan later established the "bond of fatherhood and sonship" by marrying Chagatai's daughter to Qarachar. Through his alleged descent from this marriage, Timur claimed kinship with the Chagatai Khans.

The origins of Timur's mother, Tekina Khatun, are less clear. The Zafarnama merely states her name without giving any information regarding her background. Writing in 1403, Johannes de Galonifontibus, Archbishop of Sultaniyya, claimed that she was of lowly origin. The Mu'izz al-Ansab, written decades later, says that she was related to the Yasa'uri tribe, whose lands bordered that of the Barlas. Ibn Khaldun recounted that Timur himself described to him his mother's descent from the legendary Persian hero Manuchehr. Ibn Arabshah suggested that she was a descendant of Genghis Khan. The 18th century Books of Timur identify her as the daughter of 'Sadr al-Sharia', which is believed to refer to the Hanafi scholar Ubayd Allah al-Mahbubi of Bukhara.

Early life 
His name Temur means "Iron" in the Chagatai language, his mother-tongue (cf. Uzbek Temir, Turkish Demir). It is cognate with Genghis Khan's birth name of Temüjin. Later Timurid dynastic histories claim that Timur was born on 8 April 1336, but most sources from his lifetime give ages that are consistent with a birthdate in the late 1320s. Historian Beatrice Forbes Manz suspects the 1336 date was designed to tie Timur to the legacy of Abu Sa'id Bahadur Khan, the last ruler of the Ilkhanate descended from Hulagu Khan, who died in that year.

He was a member of the Barlas, a Mongolian tribe that had been turkified in many aspects. His father, Taraghai was described as a minor noble of this tribe. However, Manz believes that Timur may have later understated the social position of his father, so as to make his own successes appear more remarkable. She states that though he is not believed to have been especially powerful, Taraghai was reasonably wealthy and influential. This is shown by Timur later returning to his birthplace following the death of his father in 1360, suggesting concern over his estate. Taraghai's social significance is further hinted at by Arabshah, who described him as a magnate in the court of Amir Husayn Qara'unas. In addition to this, the father of the great Amir Hamid Kereyid of Moghulistan is stated as a friend of Taraghai's.

In his childhood, Timur and a small band of followers raided travelers for goods, especially animals such as sheep, horses, and cattle. Around 1363, it is believed that Timur tried to steal a sheep from a shepherd but was shot by two arrows, one in his right leg and another in his right hand, where he lost two fingers. Both injuries disabled him for life. Some believe that these injuries occurred while serving as a mercenary to the khan of Sistan in what is today the Dashti Margo in southwest Afghanistan. Timur's injuries have given him the names of Timur the Lame and Tamerlane by Europeans.

Military leader 
By about 1360, Timur had gained prominence as a military leader whose troops were mostly Turkic tribesmen of the region. He took part in campaigns in Transoxiana with the Khan of the Chagatai Khanate. Allying himself both in cause and by family connection with Qazaghan, the dethroner and destroyer of Volga Bulgaria, he invaded Khorasan at the head of a thousand horsemen. This was the second military expedition that he led, and its success led to further operations, among them the subjugation of Khwarazm and Urgench.

Following Qazaghan's murder, disputes arose among the many claimants to sovereign power. Tughlugh Timur of Kashgar, the Khan of the Eastern Chagatai Khanate, another descendant of Genghis Khan, invaded, interrupting this infighting. Timur was sent to negotiate with the invader but joined with him instead and was rewarded with Transoxania. At about this time, his father died and Timur also became chief of the Berlas. Tughlugh then attempted to set his son Ilyas Khoja over Transoxania, but Timur repelled this invasion with a smaller force.

Rise to power 

It was in this period that Timur reduced the Chagatai khans to the position of figureheads while he ruled in their name. Also during this period, Timur and his brother-in-law Amir Husayn, who were at first fellow fugitives and wanderers, became rivals and antagonists. The relationship between them became strained after Husayn abandoned efforts to carry out Timur's orders to finish off Ilya Khoja (former governor of Mawarannah) close to Tashkent.
 

Timur gained followers in Balkh, consisting of merchants, fellow tribesmen, Muslim clergy, aristocracy and agricultural workers, because of his kindness in sharing his belongings with them. This contrasted Timur's behavior with that of Husayn, who alienated these people, took many possessions from them via his heavy tax laws and selfishly spent the tax money building elaborate structures. Around 1370, Husayn surrendered to Timur and was later assassinated, which allowed Timur to be formally proclaimed sovereign at Balkh. He married Husayn's wife Saray Mulk Khanum, a descendant of Genghis Khan, allowing him to become imperial ruler of the Chaghatay tribe.

Legitimization of Timur's rule 
Timur's Turco-Mongolian heritage provided opportunities and challenges as he sought to rule the Mongol Empire and the Muslim world. According to the Mongol traditions, Timur could not claim the title of khan or rule the Mongol Empire because he was not a descendant of Genghis Khan. Therefore, Timur set up a puppet Chaghatayid Khan, Suyurghatmish, as the nominal ruler of Balkh as he pretended to act as a "protector of the member of a Chinggisid line, that of Genghis Khan's eldest son, Jochi". Timur instead used the title of Amir meaning general, and acting in the name of the Chagatai ruler of Transoxania. To reinforce this position, Timur claimed the title Guregen (royal son-in-law) when he married Saray Mulk Khanum, a princess of Chinggisid descent.

As with the title of Khan, Timur similarly could not claim the supreme title of the Islamic world, Caliph, because the "office was limited to the Quraysh, the tribe of the Prophet Muhammad". Therefore, Timur reacted to the challenge by creating a myth and image of himself as a "supernatural personal power" ordained by God. Otherwise he was described as a spiritual descendant of Ali, thus claiming the lineage of both Genghis Khan and the Quraysh.

Period of expansion 

Timur spent the next 35 years in various wars and expeditions. He not only consolidated his rule at home by the subjugation of his foes, but sought extension of territory by encroachments upon the lands of foreign potentates. His conquests to the west and northwest led him to the lands near the Caspian Sea and to the banks of the Ural and the Volga. Conquests in the south and south-West encompassed almost every province in Persia, including Baghdad, Karbala and Northern Iraq.

One of the most formidable of Timur's opponents was another Mongol ruler, a descendant of Genghis Khan named Tokhtamysh. After having been a refugee in Timur's court, Tokhtamysh became ruler both of the eastern Kipchak and the Golden Horde. After his accession, he quarreled with Timur over the possession of Khwarizm and Azerbaijan. However, Timur still supported him against the Russians and in 1382 Tokhtamysh invaded the Muscovite dominion and burned Moscow.

Orthodox tradition states that later, in 1395 Timur, having reached the frontier of the Principality of Ryazan, had taken Elets and started advancing towards Moscow. Great Prince Vasily I of Moscow went with an army to Kolomna and halted at the banks of the Oka River. The clergy brought the famed Theotokos of Vladimir icon from Vladimir to Moscow. Along the way people prayed kneeling: "O Mother of God, save the land of Russia!" Suddenly, Timur's armies retreated. In memory of this miraculous deliverance of the Russian land from Timur on 26 August, the all-Russian celebration in honor of the Meeting of the Vladimir Icon of the Most Holy Mother of God was established.

Conquest of Persia 

After the death of Abu Sa'id, ruler of the Ilkhanate, in 1335, there was a power vacuum in Persia. In the end, Persia was split amongst the Muzaffarids, Kartids, Eretnids, Chobanids, Injuids, Jalayirids, and Sarbadars. In 1383, Timur started his lengthy military conquest of Persia, though he already ruled over much of Persian Khorasan by 1381, after Khwaja Mas'ud, of the Sarbadar dynasty surrendered. Timur began his Persian campaign with Herat, capital of the Kartid dynasty. When Herat did not surrender he reduced the city to rubble and massacred most of its citizens; it remained in ruins until Shah Rukh ordered its reconstruction around 1415. Timur then sent a general to capture rebellious Kandahar. With the capture of Herat the Kartid kingdom surrendered and became vassals of Timur; it would later be annexed outright less than a decade later in 1389 by Timur's son Miran Shah.

Timur then headed west to capture the Zagros Mountains, passing through Mazandaran. During his travel through the north of Persia, he captured the then town of Tehran, which surrendered and was thus treated mercifully. He laid siege to Soltaniyeh in 1384. Khorasan revolted one year later, so Timur destroyed Isfizar, and the prisoners were cemented into the walls alive. The next year the kingdom of Sistan, under the Mihrabanid dynasty, was ravaged, and its capital at Zaranj was destroyed. Timur then returned to his capital of Samarkand, where he began planning for his Georgian campaign and Golden Horde invasion. In 1386, Timur passed through Mazandaran as he had when trying to capture the Zagros. He went near the city of Soltaniyeh, which he had previously captured but instead turned north and captured Tabriz with little resistance, along with Maragha. He ordered heavy taxation of the people, which was collected by Adil Aqa, who was also given control over Soltaniyeh. Adil was later executed because Timur suspected him of corruption.

Timur then went north to begin his Georgian and Golden Horde campaigns, pausing his full-scale invasion of Persia. When he returned, he found his generals had done well in protecting the cities and lands he had conquered in Persia. Though many rebelled, and his son Miran Shah, who may have been regent, was forced to annex rebellious vassal dynasties, his holdings remained. So he proceeded to capture the rest of Persia, specifically the two major southern cities of Isfahan and Shiraz. When he arrived with his army at Isfahan in 1387, the city immediately surrendered; he treated it with relative mercy as he normally did with cities that surrendered (unlike Herat). However, after Isfahan revolted against Timur's taxes by killing the tax collectors and some of Timur's soldiers, he ordered the massacre of the city's citizens; the death toll is reckoned at between 100,000 and 200,000. An eye-witness counted more than 28 towers constructed of about 1,500 heads each. This has been described as a "systematic use of terror against towns...an integral element of Tamerlane's strategic element", which he viewed as preventing bloodshed by discouraging resistance. His massacres were selective and he spared the artistic and educated. This would later influence the next great Persian conqueror: Nader Shah.

Timur then began a five-year campaign to the west in 1392, attacking Persian Kurdistan. In 1393, Shiraz was captured after surrendering, and the Muzaffarids became vassals of Timur, though prince Shah Mansur rebelled but was defeated, and the Muzafarids were annexed. Shortly after Georgia was devastated so that the Golden Horde could not use it to threaten northern Iran. In the same year, Timur caught Baghdad by surprise in August by marching there in only eight days from Shiraz. Sultan Ahmad Jalayir fled to Syria, where the Mamluk Sultan Barquq protected him and killed Timur's envoys. Timur left the Sarbadar prince Khwaja Mas'ud to govern Baghdad, but he was driven out when Ahmad Jalayir returned. Ahmad was unpopular but got help from Qara Yusuf of the Kara Koyunlu; he fled again in 1399, this time to the Ottomans.

Tokhtamysh–Timur war 

In the meantime, Tokhtamysh, now khan of the Golden Horde, turned against his patron and in 1385 invaded Azerbaijan. The inevitable response by Timur resulted in the Tokhtamysh–Timur war. In the initial stage of the war, Timur won a victory at the Battle of the Kondurcha River. After the battle Tokhtamysh and some of his army were allowed to escape. After Tokhtamysh's initial defeat, Timur invaded Muscovy to the north of Tokhtamysh's holdings. Timur's army burned Ryazan and advanced on Moscow. He was pulled away before reaching the Oka River by Tokhtamysh's renewed campaign in the south.

In the first phase of the conflict with Tokhtamysh, Timur led an army of over 100,000 men north for more than 700 miles into the steppe. He then rode west about 1,000 miles advancing in a front more than 10 miles wide. During this advance, Timur's army got far enough north to be in a region of very long summer days causing complaints by his Muslim soldiers about keeping a long schedule of prayers. It was then that Tokhtamysh's army was boxed in against the east bank of the Volga River in the Orenburg region and destroyed at the Battle of the Kondurcha River, in 1391.

In the second phase of the conflict, Timur took a different route against the enemy by invading the realm of Tokhtamysh via the Caucasus region. In 1395, Timur defeated Tokhtamysh in the Battle of the Terek River, concluding the struggle between the two monarchs. Tokhtamysh was unable to restore his power or prestige, and he was killed about a decade later in the area of present-day Tyumen. During the course of Timur's campaigns, his army destroyed Sarai, the capital of the Golden Horde, and Astrakhan, subsequently disrupting the Golden Horde's Silk Road. The Golden Horde no longer held power after their losses to Timur.

Ismailis 
In May 1393, Timur's army invaded the Anjudan, crippling the Ismaili village only a year after his assault on the Ismailis in Mazandaran. The village was prepared for the attack, evidenced by its fortress and system of tunnels. Undeterred, Timur's soldiers flooded the tunnels by cutting into a channel overhead. Timur's reasons for attacking this village are not yet well understood. However, it has been suggested that his religious persuasions and view of himself as an executor of divine will may have contributed to his motivations. The Persian historian Khwandamir explains that an Ismaili presence was growing more politically powerful in Persian Iraq. A group of locals in the region was dissatisfied with this and, Khwandamir writes, these locals assembled and brought up their complaint with Timur, possibly provoking his attack on the Ismailis there.

Campaign against the Tughlaq dynasty 

In 1398, Timur invaded northern India, attacking the Delhi Sultanate ruled by Sultan Nasir-ud-Din Mahmud Shah Tughluq of the Tughlaq dynasty. After crossing the Indus River on 30 September 1398, he sacked Tulamba and massacred its inhabitants. Then he advanced and captured Multan by October. His invasion was unopposed as most of the Indian nobility surrendered without a fight, however he did encounter resistance from the united army of Rajputs and Muslims at Bhatner under the command of the Rajput king Dulachand, Dulachand initially opposed Timur but when hard-pressed he considered surrender. He was locked outside the walls of Bhatner by his brother and was later killed by Timur. The garrison of Bhatner then fought and were slaughtered to the last man. Bhatner was looted and burned to the ground.

While on his march towards Delhi, Timur was opposed by the Jat peasantry, who would loot caravans and then disappear in the forests, Timur had 2,000 Jats killed and many taken captive. But the Sultanate at Delhi did nothing to stop his advance.

Capture of Delhi (1398) 
The battle took place on 17 December 1398. Before the battle, Timur slaughtered some 100,000 slaves who had been captured previously in the Indian campaign. This was done out of fear that they might revolt.

Sultan Nasir-ud-Din Mahmud Shah Tughluq and the army of Mallu Iqbal had war elephants armored with chain mail and poison on their tusks. As his Tatar forces were afraid of the elephants, Timur ordered his men to dig a trench in front of their positions. Timur then loaded his camels with as much wood and hay as they could carry. When the war elephants charged, Timur set the hay on fire and prodded the camels with iron sticks, causing them to charge at the elephants, howling in pain: Timur had understood that elephants were easily panicked. Faced with the strange spectacle of camels flying straight at them with flames leaping from their backs, the elephants turned around and stampeded back toward their own lines. Timur capitalized on the subsequent disruption in the forces of Nasir-ud-Din Mahmud Shah Tughluq, securing an easy victory. Nasir-ud-Din Mahmud Shah Tughluq fled with remnants of his forces.

The capture of the Delhi Sultanate was one of Timur’s largest and most devastating victories as at that time, Delhi was one of the richest cities in the world. The city of Delhi was sacked and reduced to ruins, with the population enslaved. After the fall of the city, uprisings by its citizens against the Turkic-Mongols began to occur, causing a retaliatory bloody massacre within the city walls. After three days of citizens uprising within Delhi, it was said that the city reeked of the decomposing bodies of its citizens with their heads being erected like structures and the bodies left as food for the birds by Timur's soldiers. Timur's invasion and destruction of Delhi continued the chaos that was still consuming India, and the city would not be able to recover from the great loss it suffered for almost a century.

Campaigns in the Levant 

Before the end of 1399, Timur started a war with Bayezid I, sultan of the Ottoman Empire, and the Mamluk sultan of Egypt Nasir-ad-Din Faraj. Bayezid began annexing the territory of Turkmen and Muslim rulers in Anatolia. As Timur claimed sovereignty over the Turkoman rulers, they took refuge behind him.

In 1400, Timur invaded Armenia and Georgia. Of the surviving population, more than 60,000 of the local people were captured as slaves, and many districts were depopulated. He also sacked Sivas in Asia Minor.

Then Timur turned his attention to Syria, sacking Aleppo, and Damascus. The city's inhabitants were massacred, except for the artisans, who were deported to Samarkand.

Timur invaded Baghdad in June 1401. After the capture of the city, 20,000 of its citizens were massacred. Timur ordered that every soldier should return with at least two severed human heads to show him. When they ran out of men to kill, many warriors killed prisoners captured earlier in the campaign, and when they ran out of prisoners to kill, many resorted to beheading their own wives. British historian David Nicolle, in his "The Mongol Warlords", quotes an anonymous contemporary historian who compared Timur's army to "ants and locusts covering the whole countryside, plundering and ravaging."

Invasion of Anatolia 

In the meantime, years of insulting letters had passed between Timur and Bayezid. Both rulers insulted each other in their own way while Timur preferred to undermine Bayezid's position as a ruler and play down the significance of his military successes.

This is the excerpt from one of Timur's letters addressed to Ottoman sultan:

Finally, Timur invaded Anatolia and defeated Bayezid in the Battle of Ankara on 20 July 1402. Bayezid was captured in battle and subsequently died in captivity, initiating the twelve-year Ottoman Interregnum period. Timur's stated motivation for attacking Bayezid and the Ottoman Empire was the restoration of Seljuq authority. Timur saw the Seljuks as the rightful rulers of Anatolia as they had been granted rule by Mongol conquerors, illustrating again Timur's interest with Genghizid legitimacy.

In December 1402, Timur besieged and took the city of Smyrna, a stronghold of the Christian Knights Hospitalers, thus he referred to himself as ghazi or "Warrior of Islam". A mass beheading was carried out in Smyrna by Timur's soldiers.

With the Treaty of Gallipoli in February 1402, Timur was furious with the Genoese and Venetians, as their ships ferried the Ottoman army to safety in Thrace. As Lord Kinross reported in The Ottoman Centuries, the Italians preferred the enemy they could handle to the one they could not.

During the early interregnum, Bayezid I's son  acted as Timur's vassal. Unlike other princes, Mehmed minted coins that had Timur's name stamped as "Demur han Gürgân", alongside his own as "Mehmed bin Bayezid han". This was probably an attempt on Mehmed's part to justify to Timur his conquest of Bursa after the Battle of Ulubad. After Mehmed established himself in Rum, Timur had already begun preparations for his return to Central Asia, and took no further steps to interfere with the status quo in Anatolia.

While Timur was still in Anatolia, Qara Yusuf assaulted Baghdad and captured it in 1402. Timur returned to Persia and sent his grandson Abu Bakr ibn Miran Shah to reconquer Baghdad, which he proceeded to do. Timur then spent some time in Ardabil, where he gave Ali Safavi, leader of the Safaviyya, a number of captives. Subsequently, he marched to Khorasan and then to Samarkhand, where he spent nine months celebrating and preparing to invade Mongolia and China.

Attempts to attack the Ming dynasty 

By 1368, Han Chinese forces had driven the Mongols out of China. The first of the new Ming dynasty's emperors, the Hongwu Emperor, and his son, the Yongle Emperor, produced tributary states of many Central Asian countries. The suzerain-vassal relationship between Ming empire and Timurid existed for a long time. In 1394, Hongwu's ambassadors eventually presented Timur with a letter addressing him as a subject. He had the ambassadors Fu An, Guo Ji, and Liu Wei detained. Neither Hongwu's next ambassador, Chen Dewen (1397), nor the delegation announcing the accession of the Yongle Emperor fared any better.

Timur eventually planned to invade China. To this end Timur made an alliance with surviving Mongol tribes based in Mongolia and prepared all the way to Bukhara. Engke Khan sent his grandson Öljei Temür Khan, also known as "Buyanshir Khan" after he converted to Islam while at the court of Timur in Samarkand.

Death 
Timur preferred to fight his battles in the spring. However, he died en route during an uncharacteristic winter campaign. In December 1404, Timur began military campaigns against Ming China and detained a Ming envoy. He became ill while encamped on the farther side of the Syr Daria and died at Farab on 17 February 1405, before ever reaching the Chinese border. After his death the Ming envoys such as Fu An and the remaining entourage were released by his grandson Khalil Sultan.

Geographer Clements Markham, in his introduction to the narrative of Clavijo's embassy, states that, after Timur died, his body "was embalmed with musk and rose water, wrapped in linen, laid in an ebony coffin and sent to Samarkand, where it was buried". His tomb, the Gur-e-Amir, still stands in Samarkand, though it has been heavily restored in recent years.

Succession 

Timur had twice previously appointed an heir apparent to succeed him, both of whom he had outlived. The first, his son Jahangir, died of illness in 1376. The second, his grandson Muhammad Sultan, had died from battle wounds in 1403. After the latter's death, Timur did nothing to replace him. It was only when he was on his own death-bed that he appointed Muhammad Sultan's younger brother, Pir Muhammad as his successor.

Pir Muhammad was unable to gain sufficient support from his relatives and a bitter civil war erupted amongst Timur's descendants, with multiple princes pursuing their claims. It was not until 1409 that Timur's youngest son, Shah Rukh was able to overcome his rivals and take the throne as Timur's successor.

Wives and concubines 

Timur had forty-three wives and concubines, all of these women were also his consorts. Timur made dozens of women his wives and concubines as he conquered their fathers' or erstwhile husbands' lands.

 Turmish Agha, mother of Jahangir Mirza, Jahanshah Mirza and Aka Begi;
 Oljay Turkhan Agha (m. 1357/58), daughter of Amir Mashlah and granddaughter of Amir Qazaghan;
 Saray Mulk Khanum (m. 1367), widow of Amir Husain, and daughter of Qazan Khan;
 Islam Agha (m. 1367), widow of Amir Husain, and daughter of Amir Bayan Salduz;
 Ulus Agha (m. 1367), widow of Amir Husain, and daughter of Amir Khizr Yasuri;
 Dilshad Agha (m. 1374), daughter of Shams ed-Din and his wife Bujan Agha;
 Touman Agha (m. 1377), daughter of Amir Musa and his wife Arzu Mulk Agha, daughter of Amir Bayezid Jalayir;
 Chulpan Mulk Agha, daughter of Haji Beg of Jetah;
 Tukal Khanum (m. 1397), daughter of Mongol Khan Khizr Khawaja Oglan;
 Tolun Agha, concubine, and mother of Umar Shaikh Mirza I;
 Mengli Agha, concubine, and mother of Miran Shah;
 Toghay Turkhan Agha, lady from the Kara Khitai, widow of Amir Husain, and mother of Shah Rukh;
 Tughdi Bey Agha, daughter of Aq Sufi Qongirat;
 Sultan Aray Agha, a Nukuz lady;
 Malikanshah Agha, a Filuni lady;
 Khand Malik Agha, mother of Ibrahim Mirza;
 Sultan Agha, mother of a son who died in infancy;

His other wives and concubines included:
Dawlat Tarkan Agha, Burhan Agha, Jani Beg Agha, Tini Beg Agha, Durr Sultan Agha, Munduz Agha, Bakht Sultan Agha, Nowruz Agha, Jahan Bakht Agha, Nigar Agha, Ruhparwar Agha, Dil Beg Agha, Dilshad Agha, Murad Beg Agha, Piruzbakht Agha, Khoshkeldi Agha, Dilkhosh Agha, Barat Bey Agha, Sevinch Malik Agha, Arzu Bey Agha, Yadgar Sultan Agha, Khudadad Agha, Bakht Nigar Agha, Qutlu Bey Agha, and another Nigar Agha .

Descendants

Sons of Timur 
 Umar Shaikh Mirza I – with Tolun Agha
 Jahangir Mirza – with Turmish Agha
 Miran Shah Mirza – with Mengli Agha
 Shah Rukh Mirza – with Toghay Turkhan Agha

Daughters of Timur 
 Aka Begi (died 1382) – by Turmish Agha. Married to Muhammad Beg, son of Amir Musa Tayichiud
 Sultan Husayn Tayichiud
 Sultan Bakht Begum (died 1429/30) – by Oljay Turkhan Agha. Married first Muhammad Mirke Apardi, married second, 1389/90, Sulayman Shah Dughlat
 Sa'adat Sultan – by Dilshad Agha
 Bikijan – by Mengli Agha
 Qutlugh Sultan Agha – by Toghay Turkhan Agha

Sons of Umar Shaikh Mirza I 
 Pir Muhammad
 Iskandar
 Rustam
 Bayqara I
 Mansur
 Sultan Husayn Bayqarah
 Badi' al-Zaman
 Muhammed Mu'min
 Muhammad Zaman Mirza
 Muzaffar Hussein
 Ibrahim Hussein

Sons of Jahangir 
 Muhammad Sultan Mirza
 Pir Muhammad

Sons of Miran Shah 
 Khalil Sultan
 Abu Bakr
 Muhammad Mirza
 Abu Sa'id Mirza
 Umar Shaikh Mirza II
 Zahir-ud-din Muhammad Babur
 the Mughals
 Jahangir Mirza II

Sons of Shah Rukh Mirza 
 Mirza Muhammad Taraghay – better known as Ulugh Beg
 Abdul-Latif
 Ghiyath-al-Din Baysunghur
 Ala al-Dawla Mirza
 Ibrahim Mirza
 Sultan Muhammad
 Yadigar Muhammad
 Abul-Qasim Babur Mirza
 Sultan Ibrahim Mirza
 Abdullah Mirza
 Mirza Soyurghatmïsh Khan
 Muhammad Juki

Religious views
Timur was a practising Sunni Muslim, possibly belonging to the Naqshbandi school, which was influential in Transoxiana. His chief official religious counsellor and adviser was the Hanafi scholar 'Abdu 'l-Jabbar Khwarazmi. In Tirmidh, he had come under the influence of his spiritual mentor Sayyid Baraka, a leader from Balkh who is buried alongside Timur in Gur-e-Amir.

Timur was known to hold Ali and the Ahl al-Bayt in high regard and has been noted by various scholars for his "pro-Shia" stance. However, he also punished Shias for desecrating the memories of the Sahaba. Timur was also noted for attacking the Shia with Sunni apologism, while at other times he attacked Sunnis on religious grounds as well. In contrast, Timur held the Seljuk Sultan Ahmad Sanjar in high regard for attacking the Ismailis at Alamut, and Timur's own attack on Ismailis at Anjudan was equally brutal.

Personality 

Timur is regarded as a military genius and as a brilliant tactician with an uncanny ability to work within a highly fluid political structure to win and maintain a loyal following of nomads during his rule in Central Asia. He was also considered extraordinarily intelligentnot only intuitively but also intellectually. In Samarkand and his many travels, Timur, under the guidance of distinguished scholars, was able to learn the Persian, Mongolian, and Turkish languages (according to Ahmad ibn Arabshah, Timur could not speak Arabic). However, it was Persian which was held in distinction by Timur as it was the language not only of his court, but also that of his chancellery.

According to John Joseph Saunders, Timur was "the product of an Islamized and Iranized society", and not steppe nomadic. More importantly, Timur was characterized as an opportunist. Taking advantage of his Turco-Mongolian heritage, Timur frequently used either the Islamic religion or the sharia law, fiqh, and traditions of the Mongol Empire to achieve his military goals or domestic political aims. Timur was a learned king, and enjoyed the company of scholars; he was tolerant and generous to them. He was a contemporary of the Persian poet Hafez, and a story of their meeting explains that Timur summoned Hafiz, who had written a ghazal with the following verse:

For the black mole on thy cheek
I would give the cities of Samarkand and Bukhara.

Timur upbraided him for this verse and said, "By the blows of my well tempered sword I have conquered the greater part of the world to enlarge Samarkand and Bukhara, my capitals and residences; and you, pitiful creature, would exchange these two cities for a mole." Hafez, undaunted, replied, "It is by similar generosity that I have been reduced, as you see, to my present state of poverty." It is reported that the King was pleased by the witty answer and the poet departed with magnificent gifts.

There is a shared view that Timur's real motive for his campaigns was his imperialistic ambition, as expressed by his statement: "The whole expanse of the inhabited part of the world is not large enough to have two kings." However, besides Iran, Timur simply plundered the states he invaded with a purpose of enriching his native Samarqand and neglected the conquered areas, which may have resulted in a relatively quick disintegration of his Empire after his death.

Timur used Persian expressions in his conversations often, and his motto was the Persian phrase rāstī rustī (meaning "truth is safety" or "veritas salus"). He is credited with the invention of the Tamerlane chess variant, played on a 10×11 board.

Exchanges with Europe 

Timur had numerous  and diplomatic exchanges with various European states, especially Spain and France. Relations between the court of Henry III of Castile and that of Timur played an important part in medieval Castilian diplomacy. In 1402, the time of the Battle of Ankara, two Spanish ambassadors were already with Timur: Pelayo de Sotomayor and Fernando de Palazuelos. Later, Timur sent to the court of the Kingdom of León and Castile a Chagatai ambassador named Hajji Muhammad al-Qazi with letters and gifts.

In return, Henry III of Castile sent a famous embassy to Timur's court in Samarkand in 1403–06, led by Ruy González de Clavijo, with two other ambassadors, Alfonso Paez and Gomez de Salazar. On their return, Timur affirmed that he regarded the king of Castile "as his very own son".

According to Clavijo, Timur's good treatment of the Spanish delegation contrasted with the disdain shown by his host toward the envoys of the "lord of Cathay" (i.e., the Yongle Emperor), the Chinese ruler. Clavijo's visit to Samarkand allowed him to report to the European audience on the news from Cathay (China), which few Europeans had been able to visit directly in the century that had passed since the travels of Marco Polo.

The French archives preserve:
 A 30 July 1402 letter from Timur to Charles VI of France, suggesting that he send traders to Asia. It is written in Persian.
 A May 1403 letter. This is a Latin transcription of a letter from Timur to Charles VI, and another from Miran Shah, his son, to the Christian princes, announcing their victory over Bayezid I at Smyrna.

A copy has been kept of the answer of Charles VI to Timur, dated 15 June 1403.

In addition, Byzantine John VII Palaiologos who was a regent during his uncle's absence in the West, sent a Dominican friar in August 1401 to Timur, to pay his respect and propose paying tribute to him instead of the Turks, once he managed to defeat them.

Legacy 
Timur's legacy is a mixed one. While Central Asia blossomed under his reign, other places, such as Baghdad, Damascus, Delhi and other Arab, Georgian, Persian, and Indian cities were sacked and destroyed and their populations massacred. Thus, while Timur still retains a positive image in Muslim Central Asia, he is vilified by many in Arabia, Iraq, Persia, and India, where some of his greatest atrocities were carried out. However, Ibn Khaldun praises Timur for having unified much of the Muslim world when other conquerors of the time could not. The next great conqueror of the Middle East, Nader Shah, was greatly influenced by Timur and almost re-enacted Timur's conquests and battle strategies in his own campaigns. Like Timur, Nader Shah conquered most of Caucasia, Persia, and Central Asia along with also sacking Delhi.

Timur's short-lived empire also melded the Turko-Persian tradition in Transoxiana, and, in most of the territories that he incorporated into his fiefdom, Persian became the primary language of administration and literary culture (diwan), regardless of ethnicity. In addition, during his reign, some contributions to Turkic literature were penned, with Turkic cultural influence expanding and flourishing as a result. A literary form of Chagatai Turkic came into use alongside Persian as both a cultural and an official language.

Tamerlane virtually exterminated the Church of the East, which had previously been a major branch of Christianity but afterwards became largely confined to a small area now known as the Assyrian Triangle.

Timur is officially recognized as a national hero in Uzbekistan. His monument in Tashkent now occupies the place where Karl Marx's statue once stood.

In 1794, Sake Dean Mahomed published his travel book, The Travels of Dean Mahomet. The book begins with the praise of Genghis Khan, Timur, and particularly the first Mughal emperor, Babur. He also gives important details on the then incumbent Mughal Emperor Shah Alam II.

The poem "Tamerlane" by Edgar Allan Poe follows a fictionalized version of Timur's life.

Historical sources 

The earliest known history of his reign was Nizam al-Din Shami's Zafarnama, which was written during Timur's lifetime. Between 1424 and 1428, Sharaf ad-Din Ali Yazdi wrote a second Zafarnama drawing heavily on Shami's earlier work. Ahmad ibn Arabshah wrote a much less favorable history in Arabic. Arabshah's history was translated into Latin by the Dutch Orientalist Jacobus Golius in 1636.

As Timurid-sponsored histories, the two Zafarnamas present a dramatically different picture from Arabshah's chronicle. William Jones remarked that the former presented Timur as a "liberal, benevolent and illustrious prince" while the latter painted him as "deformed and impious, of a low birth and detestable principles".

Malfuzat-i Timuri 
The Malfuzat-i Timurī and the appended Tuzūk-i Tīmūrī, supposedly Timur's own autobiography, are almost certainly 17th-century fabrications. The scholar Abu Taleb Hosayni presented the texts to the Mughal emperor Shah Jahan, a distant descendant of Timur, in 1637–1638, supposedly after discovering the Chagatai language originals in the library of a Yemeni ruler. Due to the distance between Yemen and Timur's base in Transoxiana and the lack of any other evidence of the originals, most historians consider the story highly implausible, and suspect Hosayni of inventing both the text and its origin story.

European views 
Timur arguably had a significant impact on the Renaissance culture and early modern Europe. His achievements both fascinated and horrified Europeans from the fifteenth century to the early nineteenth century.

European views of Timur were mixed throughout the fifteenth century, with some European countries calling him an ally and others seeing him as a threat to Europe because of his rapid expansion and brutality.

When Timur captured the Ottoman Sultan Bayezid at Ankara, he was often praised and seen as a trusted ally by European rulers, such as Charles VI of France and Henry IV of England, because they believed he was saving Christianity from the Turkic Empire in the Middle East. Those two kings also praised him because his victory at Ankara allowed Christian merchants to remain in the Middle East and allowed for their safe return home to both France and England. Timur was also praised because it was believed that he helped restore the right of passage for Christian pilgrims to the Holy Land.

Other Europeans viewed Timur as a barbaric enemy who presented a threat to both European culture and the religion of Christianity. His rise to power moved many leaders, such as Henry III of Castile, to send embassies to Samarkand to scout out Timur, learn about his people, make alliances with him, and try to convince him to convert to Christianity in order to avoid war.

In the introduction to a 1723 translation of Yazdi's Zafarnama, the translator wrote:

Exhumation and alleged curse 

Timur's body was exhumed from his tomb on 19 June 1941 and his remains examined by the Soviet anthropologists Mikhail M. Gerasimov, Lev V. Oshanin and V. Ia. Zezenkova. Gerasimov reconstructed the likeness of Timur from his skull and found that his facial characteristics displayed "typical Mongoloid features", i.e. East Asian in modern terms. An anthropologic study of Timur's cranium shows that he belonged predominately to the South Siberian Mongoloid type. At , Timur was tall for his era. The examinations confirmed that Timur was lame and had a withered right arm due to his injuries. His right thighbone had knitted together with his kneecap, and the configuration of the knee joint suggests that he had kept his leg bent at all times and therefore would have had a pronounced limp. He appears to have been broad-chested and his hair and beard were red.
It is alleged that Timur's tomb was inscribed with the words, "When I rise from the dead, the world shall tremble." It is also said that when Gerasimov exhumed the body, an additional inscription inside the casket was found, which read, "Whomsoever  opens my tomb shall unleash an invader more terrible than I." Even though people close to Gerasimov claim that this story is a fabrication, the legend persists. In any case, three days after Gerasimov began the exhumation, Adolf Hitler invaded the Soviet Union. Timur was re-buried with full Islamic ritual in November 1942 just before the Soviet victory at the Battle of Stalingrad.

In the arts 
 Tamburlaine the Great, Parts I and II (English, 1563–1594): play by Christopher Marlowe
 Tamerlan ou la mort de Bajazet [Tamerlane or the Death of Bajazet] (1675): play by Jacques Pradon.
 Tamerlane (1701): play by Nicholas Rowe (English)
 Tamerlano (1724): opera by George Frideric Handel, in Italian, based on the 1675 Pradon play.
 Bajazet (1735): opera by Antonio Vivaldi, portrays the capture of Bayezid I by Timur.
 Il gran Tamerlano (1772): opera by Josef Myslivecek which also portrays the capture of Bayezid I by Timur.
 Timour the Tartar (1811): equestrian drama by Matthew Lewis
 Tamerlane (published 1827): first published poem of Edgar Allan Poe.
 Turandot (1924): opera by Giacomo Puccini (libretto by Giuseppe Adami and Renato Simoni) in which Timur is the deposed, blind former King of Tartary and father of the protagonist Calaf.
 Lord of Samarkand (The Lame Man; published 1932): story by Robert E. Howard in which Timour appears.
 Nesimi (1973): Azerbaijani film in which Timur was portrayed by Yusif Veliyev.
 Tamerlan (2003): Spanish-language novel by Colombian writer Enrique Serrano
 Day Watch (2006): Russian film in which Tamerlane in his youth is portrayed by Emir Baygazin, and in maturity by Gani Kulzhanov.
 Tamburlaine: Shadow of God (broadcast 2008): a BBC Radio 3 play by John Fletcher presenting a fictitious encounter between Tamburlaine, Ibn Khaldun, and Hafez.
 Age of Empires II: Definitive Edition (2019): a video game containing a six-chapter campaign titled "Tamerlane".

See also 
 List of largest empires
 Muslim conquests in the Indian subcontinent
 Timuri
 Timurid conquests and invasions
 Timurlengia

References

Explanatory notes

Citations

General references

Further reading 
 Abazov, Rafis. "Timur (Tamerlane) and the Timurid Empire in Central Asia." The Palgrave Concise Historical Atlas of Central Asia. Palgrave Macmillan US, 2008. 56–57.
 Forbes, Andrew, & Henley, David: "Timur's Legacy: The Architecture of Bukhara and Samarkand" (CPA Media)
 González de Clavijo, Ruy; Embassy to Tamerlane, 1403–1406, translated by Guy Le Strange, with a new Introduction by Caroline Stone (Hardinge Simpole, 2009).
 Narrative of the Embassy of Ruy Gonzalez De Clavijo to the Court of Timour, at Samarcand, A.D. 1403–6Full text at Google Books
 
 Marlowe, Christopher. Tamburlaine the Great. Ed. J. S. Cunningham. Manchester University Press, Manchester 1981.
 Manz, Beatrice Forbes. "Temür and the Problem of a Conqueror's Legacy," Journal of the Royal Asiatic Society, Third Series, Vol. 8, No. 1 (Apr. 1998)
 Marozzi, Justin. Tamerlane: sword of Islam, conqueror of the world, London: HarperCollins, 2004 
 Marozzi, Justin. "Tamerlane", in: The Art of War: great commanders of the ancient and medieval world, Andrew Roberts (editor), London: Quercus Military History, 2008. 
 Novosel'tsev, A. P. "On the Historical Evaluation of Tamerlane." Soviet studies in history 12.3 (1973): 37–70.
 Paksoy, H. B. "Nationality or Religion: Views of Central Asian Islam".
 Shterenshis, Michael V. "Approach to Tamerlane: Tradition and Innovation." Central Asia and the Caucasus 2 (2000).
 Sykes, P. M. "Tamerlane". Journal of the Central Asian Society 2.1 (1915): 17–33.
 Yüksel, Musa Şamil. "Timur’un Yükselişi ve Batı’nın Diplomatik Cevabı, 1390–1405." Selçuk Üniversitesi Türkiyat Araştırmaları Dergisi 1.18 (2005): 231–243.

External links 
 

 
1336 births
1405 deaths
Founding monarchs
Genocide perpetrators
Muslim monarchs
Royalty and nobility with disabilities
Samarkand
Timurid dynasty